Hendrik Gerhardus Stoker (1899–1993), born in Johannesburg, South Africa, was a leading Calvinist philosopher who taught at Potchefstroom. He studied there and the University of Cologne, and he completed his doctoral dissertation on "Nature and the forms of conscience" under Max Scheler.

Stoker taught at Potchefstroom University for Christian Higher Education from 1925 to 1970.  He developed a unique strand of Calvinistic philosophy called "Wysbegeerte van die skeppingsidee" or translated in English "Philosophy of the creation-idea".  He's disagreed with Herman Dooyeweerd and D. H. Th. Vollenhoven who called their philosophy "Wijsbegeerte van die Wetsidee" or translated "philosophy of the cosmonomic idea", because the creation was more encompassing principle for Stoker than the laws of creation.  The name had the further benefit for Stoker that it was distinctly Christian, while the use of the term "law" instead of "creation" was preferred by Dooyeweerd and Vollenhoven.

Stoker is however not remembered for his unique variation of Christian philosophy but for his defence of Apartheid in South Africa. 
He was a member of the Gereformeerde Kerke van Suid Afrika and a friend of the theologian and poet Totius.  He advocated educational segregation for Africans, whites and Coloured people. He was imprisoned during 1942 to 1943 for his anti-England stance and his pro-Afrikaans and pro-German sympathies.

Work 
 Een en ander oor menslike vrijheid. In: Festschrift für H.J. de Vleeschauwer. 1960, S. 150−172.

References 

John Van Der Stelt (1996) 'History of Christian philosophy: Lectures' (Dordt College)

1899 births
1993 deaths
Calvinist and Reformed philosophers
Academic staff of North-West University
University of Cologne alumni